The Bonito River is a river of Santa Catarina state in southeastern Brazil. It is a tributary of the Correntes River, part of the Uruguay River basin. The lower reaches are sometimes referred to as the Timbó River.

See also
List of rivers of Santa Catarina

References

Rivers of Santa Catarina (state)